Edward Jeremiah Hogan (April 18, 1882 – June 3, 1953) was a Canadian professional ice hockey player.

Career 
Hogan played with the Renfrew Creamery Kings of the National Hockey Association, in the 1909–10 season. He also played with the Quebec Hockey Club of the Canadian Amateur Hockey League from 1899 to 1906, 1907–08, and 1909–10. He spent the 1906–07 season with the Pittsburgh Professionals of the IHL.

References

External links
Ed Hogan at JustSportsStats

1882 births
1953 deaths
Anglophone Quebec people
Ice hockey people from Quebec City
Renfrew Hockey Club players
Canadian ice hockey right wingers